Ross S. Bagdasarian (January 27, 1919 – January 16, 1972), known professionally by his stage name David Seville, was an American singer, songwriter, record producer, and actor, best known for creating the cartoon band Alvin and the Chipmunks. Initially a stage and film actor, he rose to prominence in 1958 with the songs "Witch Doctor" and "The Chipmunk Song (Christmas Don't Be Late)", which both became Billboard number-one singles. He produced and directed The Alvin Show, which aired on CBS in 1961–62.

Life
Bagdasarian was born on January 27, 1919, in Fresno, California to an Armenian-American Family.  He had two elder brothers: Richard Sirak (1910–1966) and Harry Sisvan (1915–1989). The novelist William Saroyan was his first cousin, to whom he was very close.

Bagdasarian graduated from Fresno High School in 1937. During World War II, he served four years as a control tower operator and rose to the rank of a staff sergeant (SSgt) in the Army Air Forces. His later stage name "David Seville" originated from the fact that he was stationed in the city of Seville in Spain.

Career

Acting
Bagdasarian's Broadway debut was in 1939 when he played the newsboy in The Time of Your Life by William Saroyan, his cousin. He also appeared in minor roles in several films, such as Viva Zapata! (1952), Stalag 17 (1953), Destination Gobi (1953), Rear Window (1954), and The Proud and Profane (1956). Notably, in Alfred Hitchcock's Rear Window, he is the piano player. In Stalag 17, he sings "I Love You" in a pivotal scene at the POW Christmas Party.

Singing and songwriting
Bagdasarian's major success with songwriting came with "Come On-a My House". Originally recorded by Kay Armen in 1950, it was turned into a million-selling hit in 1951 by Rosemary Clooney released by Columbia Records. It is an adaptation of an Armenian folk song Bagdasarian wrote with his cousin William Saroyan. The song was originally composed for their off-Broadway musical The Son. It launched Clooney's career, reaching number one on Billboard charts and was number four on 
Billboard year-end top 30 singles of 1951. The song sold some 750,000 records in a month. In 1954, he wrote "Hey, Brother, Pour the Wine", a hit for Dean Martin.

In 1955 Bagdasarian signed with the then newly established Liberty Records. In early 1956 he had a transcontinental hit with the novelty record "The Trouble with Harry" (inspired by the homonymous Hitchcock film) credited to Alfi & Harry, although Alfi & Harry was just one person, Bagdasarian himself. It reached No. 44 on the Billboard chart and was a bigger hit in the United Kingdom reaching No. 15. In December 1956, he charted with his first record credited to his David Seville pseudonym, "Armen's Theme" which reached  No. 42 on the Billboard chart.

David Seville and the Chipmunks

Bagdasarian's rise to prominence came with the song "Witch Doctor" in 1958, which was created after he experimented with the speed control on a tape recorder bought with $200 (around $2,000 adjusted for inflation as of 2022) from the family savings. Liberty Records released this novelty record under the David Seville name. It is a duet between his real voice and accelerated version. The record went on to become a Billboard number-one single by April 28, 1958, and further established him as a songwriter. It sold 1.5 million copies.

Bagdasarian went on to create his trio of Chipmunks named after the executives of Liberty Records: Simon, Theodore, and Alvin, named for Simon "Si" Waronker, Theodore "Ted" Keep, and Alvin Bennett. Their debut song, "The Chipmunk Song (Christmas Don't Be Late)" was released on November 17, 1958, and became a number one hit by New Years Day. The song sold 4 million records in the first few months. It topped Billboard charts the two weeks before and two weeks after New Years and won three Grammy Awards at the 1st Annual Grammy Awards on May 4, 1959: Best Recording for Children, Best Comedy Performance, and Best Non-Classical Engineered Song. Bagdasarian won the first two as David Seville. The song was the 23rd most performed Christmas song of the 20th century.

Shana Alexander, writing for Life magazine in 1959, noted that Bagdasarian was the first case in the "annals of popular music that one man has served as writer, composer, publisher, conductor and multiple vocalist of a hit record, thereby directing all possible revenues from the song back into his pocket." Alexander also found it remarkable that Bagdasarian "can neither read nor write music nor play any musical instrument in the accepted sense of the word." Bagdasarian owned Chipmunk Enterprises, which sponsored Chipmunk-related sales. By 1963, some 15 companies were using or planned to use Alvin figures. By that year, Billboard magazine estimated the total income from the Chipmunks' record sales (including overseas sales) and record club sales to be around $20 million (around $171 million adjusted for inflation to 2021 dollars).

In the following years, the Chipmunks released several hit songs: "Alvin's Harmonica" (1959), "Ragtime Cowboy Joe" (1959), "Alvin's Orchestra" (1960), "Rudolph the Red Nosed Reindeer" (1960), "The Alvin Twist" (1962), and the album The Chipmunks Sing the Beatles Hits in 1964 during the British Invasion.

Bagdasarian then produced The Alvin Show, a TV cartoon broadcast on CBS from October 1961 to September 1962.

Personal life
Bagdasarian married Armenouhi "Armen" Kulhanjian (1927–1991) in 1946. They had three children: Carol Askine (b. 1947), an actress; Ross Jr. (b. 1949); and Adam Serak (b. 1954), a fiction writer. They lived in Los Angeles from 1950. As of 1963 he owned a grape ranch in California called the Chipmunk Ranch. In the mid-1960s, he bought Sierra Wine Corp., a winery that supplied product, among others, to E & J Gallo Winery. He died of a heart attack at his home in Beverly Hills on January 16, 1972, eleven days before his 53rd birthday. He was cremated and inurned at the Chapel of the Pines Crematory in Los Angeles.

Bagdasarian willed the Chipmunks franchise to his wife and three children. Ross Jr. said in an interview that he "worshipped" his father and felt a need to continue his work. He resumed the franchise with his wife Janice Karman in the late 1970s, after finishing law school, and became the complete owner when he bought the rights from his siblings in the mid-1990s.

Discography

Albums
The Music of David Seville (1957 Liberty 3073)
The Witch Doctor Presents: David Seville...and his Friends (1958 Liberty 3092)
Let's All Sing with the Chipmunks (1959 Liberty 3132)
The Chipmunks Sing the Beatles Hits (1964 Sunset/Liberty; as Alvin and the Chipmunks with David Seville)
Chipmunks ‘a Go-Go (1965 Liberty 3424; as Alvin, Simon and Theodore with David Seville)
The Mixed-up World of Bagdasarian (1966 Liberty 7451; recorded under David Seville's real name, Ross Bagdasarian)
The Alvin Show

Filmography
 The Greatest Show on Earth (1952) as Spectator (uncredited)
 Viva Zapata! (1952) as Officer (uncredited)
 The Stars Are Singing (1953) as Song Promoter (uncredited)
 Destination Gobi (1953) as Paul Sabatello 
 The Girls of Pleasure Island (1953) as Marine (uncredited)
 Stalag 17 (1953) as Singing Prisoner of War (uncredited)
 Alaska Seas (1954) as Joe, Jim's crewman
 Rear Window (1954) as Songwriter/pianist
 Kismet (1955) as Fevvol (uncredited)
 Hot Blood (1956) as Gas Station Attendant (uncredited)
 The Proud and Profane (1956) as Louie
 Three Violent People (1956) as Asuncion Ortega
 The Devil's Hairpin (1957) as Tani Ritter
 The Deep Six (1958) as Pvt. Aaron Slobodjian
 The Alvin Show (1961–1962, TV Series) as Alvin, Simon, Theodore and David Seville (voice, final appearance)

See also
 Armenian Americans in Los Angeles

References
Notes

Citations

Bibliography

External links

History area on TheChipmunks.com with some photos and stories about Ross Bagdasarian
[ Allmusic Entry]
David Seville Review at Rockabilly

1919 births
1972 deaths
20th-century American male actors
20th-century American singers
20th-century American pianists
American male television actors
American male voice actors
American male film actors
Singer-songwriters from California
American male singer-songwriters
American novelty song performers
Grammy Award winners
Liberty Records artists
American people of Armenian descent
Alvin and the Chipmunks
Record producers from California
Male actors from Fresno, California
Musicians from Fresno, California
Writers from Fresno, California
Burials at Chapel of the Pines Crematory
Animation composers
American male pianists
United States Army Air Forces personnel of World War II
United States Army Air Forces soldiers
20th-century American male singers